The Socialist Rifle Association (SRA) is an American socialist firearm organization that is dedicated to "providing working class people the information they need to be effectively armed for self and community defense." The group advocates for Second Amendment gun rights from a mostly left-wing perspective.

Background
The Socialist Rifle Association was initially created as a Facebook page in 2013, as "something of a joke". As time went on, supporters decided to make it a reality, and incorporated as a limited liability company in New Mexico. On October 10, 2018, the Socialist Rifle Association Inc. was founded in Kansas under the 501(c)(4) tax code provision. On October 16, 2018, a merger agreement was agreed between the two extant SRA nonprofits.

The City of Charlottesville, et al. vs. The Pennsylvania Light Foot Militia, et al. (2018)
Individuals associated with an unrelated community Facebook page calling itself the SRA attended the Unite the Right rally on the counterprotest side and were subsequently sued for their involvement. In October 2018, the city of Charlottesville filed a lawsuit against 25 groups and individuals for alleged paramilitary activity based on a recently adopted state statute. In addition to several white supremacist figures and organizations such as the Traditionalist Worker Party, League of the South and Jason Kessler, the lawsuit also listed two anti-racist groups, the original SRA group and the left-wing gun group Redneck Revolt.

Natural disaster mutual aid

Hurricane Michael
In response to the landfall of the category 5 Hurricane Michael in 2018 and the perceived inadequate response of FEMA, the SRA and the Tallahassee branches of the DSA and the PSL formed the Hurricane Michael Mutual Aid project which sought to distribute direct relief to those in need, including those who were unable to receive FEMA relief due to their undocumented status.

Hurricane Dorian
On August 29, 2019, the SRA began a fundraiser under the new organizational name "SRAid" for Hurricane Dorian disaster relief. On September 5, the SRA announced it had several volunteers staging equipment on the east coast in preparation for supply deliveries to under-served communities in Charleston, South Carolina, Wilmington, North Carolina, and the Lumbee Tribe in Robeson County, North Carolina.

Membership
In July 2019, a third of the SRA's 2,000 members identified as LGBTQ and 8 percent are transgender. The organization claimed 10,000 active members in November 2020. The SRA has 52 local chapters operating in 33 states. The organization is headed by a National Assembly consisting of elected representatives from each chapter.

Ideology
The SRA describes the goal of their organization as "to provide an alternative to the mainstream, toxic, right-wing, and non-inclusive gun culture that has dominated the firearms community for decades. We seek to provide a safe, inclusive, and left-leaning platform for talking about gun rights and self defense, free from racist and reactionary prejudices, while providing a platform for the working class to obtain the skills necessary for all aspects of community defense." The group describes itself as "working class, progressive, anarchist, socialist, communist, eco-warrior, animal liberator, anti-fascist, anti-racist, anti-capitalist, PoC, LGBTQ-plus."

Points of unity
Membership of the SRA is predicated on the acceptance of particular points of unity:
 We are working class and poor people dedicated to educating our class in the safe use of firearms for personal and community self-defense as well as recreation and subsistence hunting.
 We are a multi-tendency association of social democrats, communists, and anarchists united by class, for our class. We respect one another's political stances and differences, especially when we disagree.
 We are dedicated to Liberation and Freedom of ALL people and therefore oppose all forms of oppression and exploitation.
 We are party to our local communities and as such we volunteer in various ways to further the connections between leftist political radicals and the unorganized communities in which we live. We help feed, house and protect other working class and marginalized folks.
 We stand against the disarmament of the working class.
 We are dedicated to arming the working class, both physically and mentally.

See also
 Huey P. Newton Gun Club
 Liberal Gun Club
 National Rifle Association
 Redneck Revolt
 Pink Pistols

References

External links
 

Anti-capitalist organizations
Anti-fascist organizations in the United States
Anti-racist organizations in the United States
Far-left politics in the United States
Firearms-related organizations
Gun rights advocacy groups in the United States
Multi-tendency organizations in the United States
Organizations based in Wichita, Kansas
Organizations established in 2018
Socialist organizations in the United States
Working-class culture in the United States
Left-wing militant groups in the United States